"Adore" is a song recorded by English vocalist Jasmine Thompson for her third extended play of the same name. The track was made available for digital download on 12 June 2015, through Atlantic Records. "Adore" was written by Steve Mac, Paul Gendler and Ina Wroldsen, while production was handled by Mac alone. The track peaked within the top 50 in both Italy and Belgium, ranking at number 34 and 41, respectively. Furthermore, the song has also charted at number 91 on the German Singles Chart. The recording gained major popularity in Italy, where it was certified Platinum by the Federation of the Italian Music Industry for exceeding sales of 50,000 copies.

Music video
The accompanying music video for "Adore" was released on 12 June 2015, on Thompson's YouTube channel. It is three minutes and thirteen seconds long.

Track listing

Charts and certifications

Weekly charts

Year-end charts

Certifications

Release history

References

2015 singles
2015 songs
Jasmine Thompson songs
Songs written by Steve Mac
Songs written by Ina Wroldsen
Atlantic Records singles